Lisby Larson (born October 23, 1951, in Washington, D.C.) is an American film, musical theatre, soap opera and television actress. She made multiple appearances on the Law & Order franchise.

Television
Her daytime roles include Texas (Paige Carrington, 1980–82), As the World Turns (Mary Hopkins Campbell, 1993), and Guiding Light (Calla Matthews, 1985–86). In 2006, she joined One Life to Live as Eve McBain; she had previously appeared on the soap in 2000 as Leigh Malone.

Musical Theatre
Larson made her Broadway debut in the short-lived 1981 revival of The Five O'Clock Girl. In 1997, she played Glinda in The Municipal Opera Association of St. Louis production of The Wizard of Oz, alongside Bob Keeshan as the Wizard of Oz, Natalie Delucia as Dorothy Gale, Lara Teeter as the Scarecrow, Ken Page as the Cowardly Lion, Johnny Sloman as the Tin Man and Marilyn Sokol as the Wicked Witch of the West.

Family
Larson was married to actor Rex Hays, who died on September 8, 2006, from cancer; the union produced two sons, Connor and Matthew.

External links

Actresses from Washington, D.C.
American sopranos
American film actresses
American musical theatre actresses
American soap opera actresses
American television actresses
Living people
Musicians from Washington, D.C.
20th-century American actresses
1951 births
21st-century American women